David Martin (born February 22, 1981) is an American professional tennis player.

He teamed with Scott Lipsky to win his first ATP doubles title in February 2008 at the SAP Open in San Jose, California, defeating the number one ranked doubles team of Bob and Mike Bryan.

Tennis career
Before attending Stanford, David was a US Open Boys' Doubles champion with eventual Stanford teammate K. J. Hippensteel in 1998.

He first teamed up with fellow American Scott Lipsky in doubles in college.  They finished their college career ranked as the #2 team in the nation, and they extended their partnership into their pro careers.  In 2007, Martin and Lipsky qualified for the 2007 Wimbledon men's doubles tournament, where the pair lost in the third round. He and Lipsky reached the ATP Los Angeles men's doubles final in 2007, where the team lost in straight sets to the top-ranked Bob and Mike Bryan.  Lipsky and Martin captured their first ATP title in February 2008 at the SAP Open at HP Pavilion in San Jose, defeating the number one ranked doubles team of Bob and Mike Bryan, 7–6(4), 7–5 in the finals.

His career-high doubles ranking was World No. 38, achieved in May 2008.

ATP career finals

Doubles: 6 (1–5)

References

External links

 

1981 births
Living people
American male tennis players
Sportspeople from Huntington Beach, California
Sportspeople from Tulsa, Oklahoma
Stanford Cardinal men's tennis players
Tennis people from California
Tennis people from Oklahoma
US Open (tennis) junior champions
Grand Slam (tennis) champions in boys' doubles